Hambowal  is a village in Kapurthala district of Punjab State, India. The village is administrated by a Sarpanch, who is an elected representative.

Demography 
According to the report published by Census India in 2011, Hambowal has total number of 166 houses and population of 864 of which include 432 males and 432 females. Literacy rate of Hambowal is 76.26%, higher than state average of 75.84%.  The population of children under the age of 6 years is 89 which is 10.30% of total population of Hambowal, and child sex ratio is approximately  648, lower than state average of 846.

Population data

Air travel connectivity 
The closest airport to the village is Sri Guru Ram Dass Jee International Airport.

Villages in Kapurthala

References

External links
  Villages in Kapurthala
 Kapurthala Villages List

Villages in Kapurthala district